Dekanisora (1730) was an Onondaga chief and orator. Holding a position on the Iroquois Grand Council, he attempted to maintain peace between the Iroquois and the French and English, and to maintain independence from both. Cadwallader Colden described Dekanisora as one of the world's best speakers.

Life 
Dekanisora was born circa 1650.

In 1688, Dekanisora was part of a group of Iroquois who were captured and then released by Kondiaronk in a successful attempt to create conflict between the Iroquois and the French. The group was told that the French were responsible for the death of one member who was not released with them, and attacked Montreal as a result.

In 1692, Dekanisora led an Iroqois diplomatic mission to Montreal.

In 1694, Dekanisora was the organizer of a truce between the Iroquois and the French in Quebec. After attempting to include the English in peace negotiations, he found that they did not want peace between the French and the Iroquois, and asserted the independence of the Iroquois while simultaneously promising their loyalty to the English. The 1694 peace negotiations eventually broke down, but in 1701, Dekanisora successfully negotiated a peace treaty between the Iroquois and the French.

In 1726, Dekanisora was one of six Iroquois ambassadors who made a trusteeship agreement to surrender the Iroquois hunting lands to the King of England with the expectation that they would be maintained for Iroquois use.

Dekanisora died in 1730 during a treaty-related meeting in Albany.

References 

Iroquois people
1730 deaths
Native American leaders
Indigenous leaders in Canada
Ambassadors